Esporte Clube Teresópolis, usually known as Teresópolis, and since 2008 as Teresópolis/DalPonte, is a Brazilian futsal club from Teresópolis, Rio de Janeiro state. Founded  on July 17, 2003, it is, as of 2008, competing in Brazilian top division futsal league, which is the Liga Futsal, and competed in the same league in the previous year.

History
On July 17, 2003, Esporte Clube Teresópolis was founded.

Four years after being founded, the club won the state championship for the first time, beating Petrópolis Esporte Clube, of the neighbor city of Petrópolis in the final. In the same year the club competed in the Liga Futsal, finishing in the ninth position.

In 2008, the club is again competing in the Liga Futsal. Due to a partnership with sports manufacturer DalPonte, Teresópolis is competing as Teresópolis/DalPonte.

Achievements

 Campeonato Carioca de Futsal:
 Winners (1): 2007
 Campeonato Carioca de Futsal Sub-20:
 Winners (1): 2005

References

External links
 Esporte Clube Teresópolis's official website

Futsal clubs established in 2003
2003 establishments in Brazil
Futsal clubs in Brazil
Sports teams in Rio de Janeiro (state)
Teresópolis